Joulupukki is a Finnish Christmas figure. The name joulupukki literally means "Christmas goat" or "Yule Goat" in Finnish; the word pukki comes from the Germanic root bock, which is a cognate of the English "buck", and means "billy-goat". An old Scandinavian custom, the figure is now often conflated with Santa Claus.

Origins and description
The Joulupukki was originally a pagan tradition. The Joulupukki may also be a man turned into a goat-man on Christmas Eve (as depicted in Elsa Beskow's Peter and Lotta's Christmas). Today, in some parts of Finland, the custom persists of persons performing in goat costume in return for leftover Christmas food. The performer traditionally is an older man, who is called a "".

He usually wears warm red robes, but with a broad band of blue near the fur, uses a walking stick, and travels in a sleigh pulled by a number of reindeer (which do not fly, unlike Santa Claus' team). In Lapland, he rides in a pulkka, rather than a sleigh. The popular holiday song "Rudolph the Red-Nosed Reindeer", in its Finnish translation, Petteri Punakuono, has led to Rudolph's general acceptance in Finland as Joulupukki's lead reindeer. Joulupukki is often mentioned as having a wife, Joulumuori ("Old Lady Christmas"), but tradition says little of her.

Joulupukki's other side

Pagans used to have festivities to honour the return of the sun and some believe Joulupukki is the earliest form of present-day Santa. The Yule Goat was thought by some to be an ugly creature and frightened children while others believe it was an invisible creature that helped prepare for Yule.

Popular radio programs from the year 1927 onwards probably had great influence in reformatting the concept with the Santa-like costume, reindeer and Korvatunturi as his dwelling place. Because there really are reindeer in Finland, and Finns live up North, the popular American story took root in Finland very quickly.

Finland's Joulupukki receives over 500,000 letters from over 200 countries every year. Most letters come from Poland, Italy, China, Taiwan, Hong Kong, and Macau .

Joulupukki is a prominent character in Rare Exports, a movie based on the award-winning shorts by Jalmari Helander.

See also
 Section on Finland in Christmas worldwide
 Korvatunturi
 Rare Exports (movie)
 Santa Claus Village
 Yule Goat
 Krampus

References

Christmas characters
Christian folklore
Finnish folklore
Finnish mythology
Santa Claus
Christmas gift-bringers
Yule
fi:Joulupukki#Suomi